Zanja Pytá (guarani for Red Trench) is a city and district in Paraguay, located in the Amambay Department. It was part of the Pedro Juan Caballero District, and was independent from this in 2012.
The city lies on the border with the Brazilian city of Sanga Puitã in the state of Mato Grosso do Sul, and has an estimated population of  8,165 inhabitants, according to the INE estimations.

References

External links
 En Zanja Pytã y José F. López eligen autoridades

Populated places in the Amambay Department